Justin Mapp (born October 18, 1984) is an American former soccer player who played as a midfielder. Mapp has been described as being versatile and known for possessing "speed and creative abilities from out wide, but also his ability to drift inside and generate offense."

Career

Professional
Mapp graduated from the Bradenton Academy in 2001 and signed with MLS as a Project-40 player. He was drafted by D.C. United with the fourth overall pick in the 2002 MLS SuperDraft, but played only 28 minutes for DC in his first year as a pro. The Chicago Fire acquired Mapp for Dema Kovalenko before the 2003 season, and he has been an important player in the squad since, helping them to the 2003 US Open Cup. In two seasons with the Fire, Mapp scored six goals and added seven assists.

After eight years with Chicago, Mapp was traded to Philadelphia Union on July 26, 2010 in exchange for allocation money. Mapp won "MLS Player of the Week" honors in Week 11 of the 2011 season for his 2-goal performance in the club's 6–2 win against Toronto FC. This performance earned the recognition of the North American Soccer Reporters society. One of his goals was even nominated for the MLS Goal of the Week award. On June 8, Mapp was named a nominee for the MLS All-Star Game. On  June 28, he was said to be leading in text voting for the All-Star Game.

After a season and a half with Philadelphia, Mapp was selected by expansion franchise Montreal Impact in the 2011 MLS Expansion Draft on November 23, 2011. He said he was surprised to be unprotected by the Union. On May 29, 2013 Mapp was awarded the 2013  George Gross Memorial Trophy for his play in the Canadian Championship, leading Montreal to victory over  Vancouver Whitecaps FC in the final. A year later, he claimed the award again after Montreal defeated Toronto FC in the 2014 final making him one of only two players, the other being Dwayne De Rosario, to win the award twice.

After his contract expired following the 2015 season, Mapp signed with Sporting Kansas City, becoming the first free agent signing in MLS history. He played six times for Kansas before retiring at the end of 2017.

International
Mapp has played for various youth United States national teams, including  the 2001 Under-17 World Championship in Trinidad and Tobago. He started all five matches for the U.S. in the 2003 World Youth Championship in the United Arab Emirates. Mapp made his debut for the senior team on October 12, 2005 against Panama. Mapp also came on as a sub January 20, 2007 against Denmark, running 70 yards with the ball before setting up Jonathan Bornstein's game-winning goal. He also played for USA in Copa América 2007.

Career statistics

Club

International

Honors

United States
CONCACAF Gold Cup: 2007

Chicago Fire
Major League Soccer Supporters Shield: 2003
Lamar Hunt U.S. Open Cup (2): 2003, 2006

Montreal Impact
Canadian Championship (2): 2013, 2014
Walt Disney World Pro Soccer Classic: 2013

Individual
MLS Best XI: 2006
George Gross Memorial Trophy (2): 2013, 2014

Personal life
Mapp and girlfriend Kathleen Hilario had a child they named Jackson Sanders Mapp on March 24, 2016.

References

External links
 
 
 

1984 births
Living people
People from Brandon, Mississippi
American soccer players
American expatriate soccer players
D.C. United players
Chicago Fire FC players
Philadelphia Union players
CF Montréal players
Sporting Kansas City players
CONCACAF Gold Cup-winning players
United States men's youth international soccer players
United States men's under-20 international soccer players
United States men's international soccer players
2007 CONCACAF Gold Cup players
2007 Copa América players
Expatriate soccer players in Canada
Major League Soccer players
Major League Soccer All-Stars
D.C. United draft picks
Soccer players from Mississippi
Association football midfielders